Nanxiong, historically Namyung, Namhung, and Nanhsiung, is a county-level city of northern Guangdong province, People's Republic of China, bordering Jiangxi to the north, east and southeast. It is under the administration of Guangdong Province.

Climate

References

County-level cities in Guangdong
Shaoguan